Neil French may refer to:
Neil French (businessman), advertising executive
Neil French (cricketer)
Neil French (horseman) in Bing Crosby Stakes